The Synod of the Sun is a higher governing body of the Presbyterian Church (USA) in the states of Texas, Louisiana, Arkansas and Oklahoma.

It has 11 Presbyteries, 843 congregations and 158,000 (91,061 in 2021) members.

The Synod is headquartered in the Dallas-Fort Worth Metroplex suburb of Irving, Texas.

List of Presbyteries
Arkansas (northern and central Arkansas, HQ in Little Rock)
Cimarron (northern Oklahoma including the Oklahoma Panhandle, HQ in Stillwater)
Eastern Oklahoma (HQ in Tulsa)
Grace (northern, northeastern, and eastern Texas, co-located with Synod HQ in Irving)
Indian Nations (southern and western Oklahoma, HQ in Oklahoma City)
Mission (central and southern Texas, HQ in San Antonio)
New Covenant (southeastern Texas, HQ in Houston)
Palo Duro (Texas Panhandle and South Plains, HQ in Lubbock)
Pines (southern Arkansas, north and central Louisiana, HQ in Ruston)
South Louisiana (HQ in Baton Rouge)
Tres Rios (west Texas, HQ in Midland)

See also
 Christianity in Houston

References

External links 
 Synod of the Sun official site

Presbyterian Church (USA)
Presbyterian synods